The Diocese of Springfield in Massachusetts is a Latin Church ecclesiastical territory or diocese of the Catholic Church in the New England region of the United States.  The diocese comprising the counties of Berkshire, Franklin, Hampshire, and Hampden in the Commonwealth of Massachusetts. The Diocese of Springfield of Massachusetts is a suffragan diocese in the ecclesiastical province of the metropolitan Archdiocese of Boston.

History
Before the American Revolution, the British Province of Massachusetts Bay, which included the Springfield area, had enacted laws prohibiting the practice of Catholicism in the colony. It was even illegal for a priest to reside there. To gain the support of Catholics for the Revolution, colonial leaders were forced to make concessions.  Massachusetts enacted religious freedom for Catholics in 1780.

Pope Pius VII erected the Diocese of Boston on April 8, 1808, including all of New England in its jurisdiction. On June 14, 1870, Pope Pius IX erected the Diocese of Springfield.  He removed  Berkshire, Franklin, Hampden, Hampshire, and Worcester counties from the Diocese of Boston, making the new diocese a suffragan of the Archdiocese of New York.  Pius IX appointed Reverend Patrick O'Reilly from the Diocese of Boston as the first bishop of the new diocese.

During O'Reilly's time as bishop, the Catholic population of the diocese increased from 90,000 to 200,000; its priests from 43 to 196; its religious women from 12 to 321. O'Reilly laid the cornerstones of nearly 100 church, school or buildings.  He established a hospital in Holyoke, Massachusetts that was operated by the Sisters of Providence opened orphanages in Holyoak and Worcester. O'Reilly persuaded the Sisters of Charity and the Sisters of Notre Dame de Namur to set up congregations in the diocese. Mercy Hospital in Springfield was developed from mission of the Sisters of Providence of St. Vincent de Paul. 

On February 12, 1875,  Pius IX elevated the Diocese of Boston to the Archdiocese of Boston. He transferred the Diocese of Springfield from the Archdiocese of New York to the new archdiocese.O’Reilly died on May 28, 1892  Pope Leo XIII appointed Reverend Thomas  Beaven as O'Reilly's replacement.

In addition to French and Irish parishes, Beaven established churches in the diocese for Polish, Italian, Lithuanian, Slovakian and Maronite Rite Catholics.During his tenure, he opened the Beaven-Kelly Home for senior men; a home for abandoned infants; hospitals in Worcester, Springfield, Montague, and Adams; orphanages in Holyoke, Worcester, and Leicester; a House of the Good Shepherd at Springfield; and residences for single working women in many places.  Beaven died in 1920.

Pope Benedict XV named Reverend Thomas O'Leary as the new bishop of Springfield. During his tenure, he introduced the Passionists and Sisters of Providence, expanded Mercy Hospital in Springfield and opened 24 new parishes. Pope Pius XI on October 26, 1923, renamed the Diocese of Springfield as the Diocese of Springfield in Massachusetts.  This was to avoid confusion with the newly erected Diocese of Springfield in Illinois.

In 1928, O'Leary began planning the new Our Lady of the Elms College in Chicopee, Massachusetts, to be first Catholic college for women in Western Massachusetts. O'Leary died in 1949.  

When Pope Pius XII erected the Diocese of Worcester on January 14, 1950, he removed Worcester County from the Diocese of Springfield in Massachusetts.  This action established the present territory of the Diocese of Springfield in Massachusetts. On January 28, 1950, Pius XII appointed Reverend Christopher Weldon as its new bishop.

During his tenure, Weldon oversaw the construction of Cathedral High School and Our Lady of Lourdes School, both in Springfield He added a wing to Farren Memorial Hospital in Montague, Massachusetts, and built Mont Marie, the motherhouse of the Sisters of St. Joseph of Springfield. Weldon erected 10 new parishes, and constructed 11 new churches and several parish centers. He  established a center for the Hispanic apostolate in Springfield, and a diocesan newspaper in 1954.

Suppression and closure of parishes
Following a decline in parish membership and attendance at weekly Mass, many churches in the diocese have been merged or closed.  As of 2010, 65 churches had been closed, with 13 of those buildings housing new congregations created by mergers.  Bishop Timothy McDonnell was responsible for the majority of these parish closures.

Sexual abuse
On September 24, 2004, former Springfield Bishop Thomas Dupré was indicted by a Hampden County grand jury on two counts of child molestation. He became the first Catholic bishop ever to be indicted for sexual abuse. However, the Springfield district attorney was forced to drop the charges because the statute of limitations had expired.

In September 2018, a diocesan Review Board notified Bishop Rozanski that it had found an allegation of sexual abuse by Weldon credible. The board cited a Chicopee, Massachusetts, resident who said that Weldon had abused him a child. The board later split on the case, with several members saying that the victim did not name Weldon directly, while three others present maintained they had witnessed otherwise. In June 2019, Rozanski met with the victim, saying he found the allegations "deeply troubling". In June 2020, an investigation by retired Superior Court Judge Peter A. Velis found the victim's claim "to be unequivocally credible."

After Velis' findings were released, Rozanski asked Trinity Health of New England to remove Weldon's name from its rehabilitation center, the former Farren Memorial Hospital in Montague. Weldon's remains were disinterred and moved to more secluded spot in the cemetery. He ordered the removal of all photographs, memorials and other mentions of Weldon from all diocesan facilities, schools and churches.

In February 2019, a news report stated that the Diocese of Springfield had received 15 complaints of sexual abuse in 2018. On May 27, 2020, the Diocese of Springfield formed an independent task force to advise the Diocesan Bishop on allegations of sexual abuse. In June 2020, an independent investigation found allegations against the late Bishop Christopher J. Weldon to be credible.

Both Bishops Weldon and Dupré were later alleged to have perpetrated sexual abuse of a minor or minors and to have covered up the murder of Danny Croteau by a priest in their charge, Richard R. Lavigne, who had sexually abused and then murdered the 13-year-old altar boy in 1972. After waiting over two decades, a woman who identified as a clergy abuse victim from the Diocese of Springfield saw the name of her abuser, the late Rev. Daniel Gill, added to the inventory of "credibly accused" priests; Rev. Gill had served at five churches in Hampden and Berkshire counties.

A civil lawsuit brought by a Chicopee former altar boy names in a cover-up as defendants the Roman Catholic Bishop of Springfield, a Corporation Sole, John J. Egan, former Bishop Mitchell T. Rozanski, Patricia McManamy, Monsignor Christopher Connelly, Jeffrey Trant, John Hale, Kevin Murphy and Mark Dupont. In July 2022, the Supreme Judicial Court of the Commonwealth of Massachusetts rejected the Diocese of Springfield's claim that the church was protected by charitable immunity, and the Diocese's motion for the charges of sexual abuse and subsequent cover-up be dismissed. The Court based this decision on the argument that sexual assault against children does not "involve conduct related to a charitable mission." The Diocese faces another lawsuit in Hampden Superior Court from an 84 year old Chicopee woman over allegations her parish priest grabbed her buttocks during a Mass in 2019. The lawsuit states that she made a report to the Franciscan order and to the Springfield diocese, speaking with Jeffrey Trant, director of the Office of Safe Environment and Victim Assistance, and no charges were brought forward. The lawsuit claims assault and battery, infliction of emotional distress, negligent supervision and negligent hiring from the Diocese.

Bishops

Bishops of Springfield (in Massachusetts)
 Patrick Thomas O'Reilly (1870-1892)
 Thomas Daniel Beaven (1892-1920)
 Thomas Michael O'Leary (1921-1949)
 Christopher Joseph Weldon (1950-1977)
 Joseph Francis Maguire (1977-1992; coadjutor bishop 1976-1977)
 John Aloysius Marshall (1992-1994)
 Thomas Ludger Dupré (1995-2004)
 Timothy Anthony McDonnell (2004–2014)
 Mitchell Thomas Rozanski (2014–2020)
 William Draper Byrne (2020–present)

Auxiliary bishops
Leo Edward O'Neil (1980-1989), appointed Coadjutor Bishop of Manchester and subsequently succeeded to that see
Thomas Ludger Dupré (1990-1995), appointed Bishop of Springfield in Massachusetts (see above)

Other priests of this diocese who became bishops
 Daniel Francis Feehan, appointed Bishop of Fall River in 1907
 Joseph John Rice, appointed Bishop of Burlington in 1910
 Joseph Francis McGrath, appointed Bishop of Baker City in 1918
 William Augustine Hickey, appointed Coadjutor Bishop of Providence in 1919 and subsequently succeeded to that see
 Timothy Joseph Harrington, appointed Auxiliary Bishop of Worcester in 1968

Office of Safe Environment & Victim Assistance
 Jeffrey Trant, appointed Director in 2019

Significant church buildings
The Basilica of St. Stanislaus in Chicopee, Massachusetts, is located within the Diocese of Springfield.

Education

High Schools 

 Pope Francis Preparatory School, Springfield (9-12)
 Saint Mary High School, Westfield (9-12)

Closed:
 Cathedral High School, Springfield (merged into Pope Francis Preparatory School)
 Holyoke Catholic High School, Chicopee (merged into Pope Francis Preparatory School)
 St. Joseph Central High School, Pittsfield (closed 2017)

See also

 Catholic Church by country
 Catholic Church in the United States
 Ecclesiastical Province of Boston
 Global organisation of the Catholic Church
 List of Roman Catholic archdioceses (by country and continent)
 List of Roman Catholic dioceses (alphabetical) (including archdioceses)
 List of Roman Catholic dioceses (structured view) (including archdioceses)
 List of the Catholic dioceses of the United States

 Sexual abuse scandal in Springfield in Massachusetts diocese

References

External links
 Roman Catholic Diocese of Springfield in Massachusetts Official Site
 Catholic Hierarchy Profile of the Diocese of Springfield in Massachusetts
 

 
Catholic Church in Massachusetts
Culture of Springfield, Massachusetts
Springfield|Springfield in Massachusetts
Springfield in Massachusetts
Springfield in Massachusetts
1870 establishments in Massachusetts